Baradem Mukalla Stadium is a multi-use stadium in Mukalla, Yemen with grass surface.  It is used mostly for football matches and serves as the home stadium of Al-Sha'ab Hadramaut.  The stadium holds 20,000 people.

References

Football venues in Yemen